The Jimi Homeless Experience is an online social/political cartoon strip created and written by Jon Kinyon. The webcomic is drawn by underground artist Big Tasty, who is a frequent contributor to Girls and Corpses Magazine. The strip is primarily about a small group of social outcasts and proudly flaunts its Grotesque orientation and black humor.

This webcomic has been part of the BuzzComix web portal since January 2006.

Related Works
 The Jimi Homeless Experience released Are You Homeless?, a full-length CD of parody songs written and produced by Jon Kinyon. It features parodies of some of Jimi Hendrix' biggest hits.
 A Jimi Homeless stop motion animation was featured on MyToons in March 2008.

References

External links 
 Official site
 Jimi Homeless Experience on BuzzComix
 The Jimi Homeless Experience parody album on CDbaby

2000s webcomics
Parody webcomics
American comedy webcomics
Political webcomics
2006 webcomic debuts